

See also
Freezing-point depression
Boiling-point elevation

References

Chemistry-related lists
Phase transitions
Phases of matter